The 1950–51 Scottish Division B was won by Queen of the South who, along with second placed Stirling Albion, were promoted to Division A. Alloa Athletic finished bottom.

Table

References 

 Scottish Football Archive

Scottish Division Two seasons
2
Scot